Roots Millennium Schools is a part of Roots School System founded in 1988 by Mrs. Riffat Mushtaq. Roots Millennium Schools was established by her son Chaudhry Faisal Mushtaq and is operating campuses in 20 cities of Pakistan.

History 
Roots Millennium Schools is an ISO 9001:2008 certified educational institute.

Accreditation & affiliation 
Roots Millennium Schools Pakistan is a Cambridge International Examinations associated school, An edexcel International affiliated school, also an affiliate center of the University of London International Programmes United Kingdom, is a candidate school for International Baccalaureate IB Middle Years Programme, a Microsoft mentor status school 2014, a member of Goethe-Institut Pasch schools network. It was selected as one of the Arabia 500 fastest growing organizations in year 2012. Roots millennium schools is accredited with Inter Board Committee of Chairmen (IBCC Pakistan) and Higher Education Commission of Pakistan.

Awards and recognition 
It was awarded with 'Brands of the Year Award 2011 - 2012' for excellence in education sector in Pakistan.
Winner of 2nd Global Human Resource Excellence Award in year 2011.

See also 
Roots Ivy International University

References

External links 
Roots Millennium Schools official website
Roots School System official website 

School systems in Pakistan
1988 establishments in Pakistan
Educational institutions established in 1988